is the 33rd single by the Japanese idol group Berryz Kobo,  released in Japan on October 2, 2013.

The physical CD single debuted at fourth place in the Japanese Oricon weekly singles chart.

Release 
The single was released in four versions: Limited Editions A, B, C, and D and a regular edition. Each edition has a different cover. All the limited editions came with a sealed-in serial-numbered entry card for the lottery to win a ticket to one of the single's launch events. The limited editions A, B, and C included a bonus DVD.

Track listing

Regular Edition, Limited Editions A, B, C

Limited Edition D

Bonus 
Sealed into all the limited editions
 Event ticket lottery card with a serial number

Charts

References

External links 
 CD single — profile on the Hello! Project official website

2013 singles
Japanese-language songs
Berryz Kobo songs
Songs written by Tsunku
Song recordings produced by Tsunku
2013 songs
Piccolo Town singles
Torch songs